Gerard Labuda (28 December 1916 – 1 October 2010) was a Polish historian whose main fields of interest were the Middle Ages and the Western Slavs. He was born in Kashubia. He lived and died in Poznań, Poland.

Life
Labuda was born in Nowa Huta, Pomeranian Voivodeship, Kartuzy, Poland (before 1918 Neuhütte/ Karthaus, West Prussia / Prussian Partition of Poland, Germany), into a Kashubian family.  He was the son of Stanislaw Labuda and Anastazja Baranowska. From 1950 he was a professor at Poznań University; rector 1962–1965; from 1951 a member of the Polish Academy of Learning (PAU); president 1989–1994;  from 1964 member of the Polish Academy of Sciences (PAN); vice-president 1984–1989; from 1959 to 1961 director of the Western Institute (Instytut Zachodni) in Poznań and a member of the New York Academy of Sciences. He was buried in Luzino - Kashubia.

From 1958 onwards he edited the multi-volume Słownik Starożytności Słowiańskich (Dictionary of Slavonic Antiquities) and published historical sources. Author of more than 30 books and close to 2000 scholarly publications.

Awarded the Grand Cross of the Order of Polonia Restituta (1996) and the highest Polish distinction Order of the White Eagle (2010; posthumously) .

Award of the Alfred Jurzykowski Foundation (USA, 1983), Herder Award (Austria, 1991). State of Poland awards (1949, 1951, 1970).

Honorary Doctorates of Gdańsk University (1986), Nicolas Copernicus University (1993), Jagiellonian University (1995), Warsaw University (1997), Wrocław University (1999) and Szczecin University (2003).

Works
Studia nad początkami państwa polskiego (Studies of the early Polish statehood), Cracow 1946.Pierwsze państwo słowiańskie - państwo Samona (The first Slavonic state - Samon's state), Poznań 1949.Fragmenty dziejów Słowiańszczyzny Zachodniej (Fragments of the History of Western Slavdom), vols. 1–2, 1960–64.Polska granica zachodnia. Tysiąc lat dziejów politycznych (Poland's Western Border: a Thousand Years of Political History), 1971.Pierwsze państwo polskie (The first Polish state), Cracow 1989.O Kaszubach, ich nazwie i ziemi zamieszkania (Kashubian People, their name and land), Gdynia 1991. Kaszubi i ich dzieje (Kashubians and their history), 1996, Św. Stanisław Biskup krakowski, Patron Polski (Stanislas Bishop of Cracow, Patron Saint of Poland), Poznań 2000.Mieszko I, Wrocław 2002.Słowiańszczyzna starożytna i wczesnośredniowieczna (Slavdom in antiquity and early middle ages), 2003.Historia Kaszubów w dziejach Pomorza (The history of Kashubians within history of Pomerania) t.1 Czasy średniowieczne (vol.1 Middle ages)'', Gdańsk 2006.

See also
List of Poles

External links
 Jak Kaszuba z Kaszubą. O straconych szansach, przywiązaniu do symboli oraz o narodzie kaszubskim z historykiem prof. Gerardem Labudą rozmawia Tomasz Żuroch-Piechowski, "Tygodnik Powszechny", 26.03.2007 r. Interview (in Polish)

1916 births
2010 deaths
People from Kartuzy County
Members of the Polish Academy of Learning
Members of the Polish Academy of Sciences
20th-century Polish historians
Polish male non-fiction writers
People from West Prussia
Kashubians
Kashubian culture
Recipients of the Order of the Banner of Work
Herder Prize recipients
Members of the German Academy of Sciences at Berlin
People from Poznań